The 2019 USAFL National Championships were the 23rd instalment of the premier United States annual Australian rules football club tournament.

2019 USAFL National Championships club rankings

Men

Women

References

External links 

USAFL season
Australian rules football competitions
National championships in the United States